The 1973 winners of the Torneo di Viareggio (in English, the Viareggio Tournament, officially the Viareggio Cup World Football Tournament Coppa Carnevale), the annual youth football tournament held in Viareggio, Tuscany, are listed below.

Format
The 16 teams are organized in knockout rounds. The round of 16 are played in two-legs, while the rest of the rounds are single tie.

Participating teams
Italian teams

  Atalanta
  Bologna
  Fiorentina
  Lazio
  L.R. Vicenza
  Milan
  Napoli
  Torino

European teams

  Újpest Dózsa
  Dukla Praha
  Dinamo Zagreb
  Rangers
  Bayern München
  Benfica
  Steaua B.
  Crystal Palace

Tournament fixtures

Champions

Footnotes

External links
 Official Site (Italian)
 Results on RSSSF.com

1973
1972–73 in Italian football
1972–73 in Yugoslav football
1972–73 in German football
1972–73 in Czechoslovak football
1972–73 in Portuguese football
1972–73 in English football
1972–73 in Scottish football
1972–73 in Hungarian football
1972–73 in Romanian football